The Metropolitan Railroad was a 19th-century Maryland corporation that proposed to build a railroad line from Washington, D.C., to  the vicinity of Frederick, Maryland, where it would connect with the Baltimore and Ohio Railroad (B&O), and continue to Hagerstown.  The company was organized by businessmen from Washington and Montgomery County, Maryland, and was chartered by the Maryland General Assembly in 1853.  It conducted some initial land surveys, but had difficulty raising funds and went bankrupt in 1863.  The B&O subsequently constructed a rail line on a similar route, and opened its Metropolitan Branch in 1873.

References

 Maryland General Assembly. “An Act to incorporate the Metropolitan Rail Road Company.” 1853 Md. Laws, Chap. 196. Passed May 5, 1853.
 
 

1853 establishments in Maryland
Baltimore and Ohio Railroad lines
Defunct Maryland railroads
Defunct Washington, D.C., railroads
Economy of Maryland
Railway companies disestablished in 1863
Railway companies established in 1853
Transportation in Montgomery County, Maryland
American companies established in 1853
American companies disestablished in 1863